Thymus citriodorus, the lemon thyme or citrus thyme, is a lemon-scented evergreen mat-forming perennial plant in the family Lamiaceae. There has been a great amount of confusion over the plant's correct name and origin. Recent DNA analysis suggests that it is not a hybrid or cross, but a distinct species as it was first described in 1811.

It prefers full sun and well draining soil. The bloom period is mid to late summer, with pink to lavender flowers that are a nectar source for bees and butterflies.

Uses
Thymus citriodorus and its cultivars are grown as ornamentals, culinary herbs, and medicinal plants. In landscaping, the plants are often used as groundcovers or for planting in beds, between stepping stones, and in containers. In xeriscaping it is useful in hot, arid regions. The plant is drought-tolerant once established. As nectar-producing plants, they are cultivated in bee and butterfly gardens.

The leaves are eaten raw in salads or used as a fresh or dried flavoring herb in cooking and for herbal teas. Other uses include essential oil, folk remedies, antiseptics, respiratory aids, aromatherapy, deodorants, perfumes, skincare and cosmetics.

Taxonomy and synonyms
Thymus citriodorus has had many different names over time, including Thymus × citriodorus, Thymus fragrantissimus, Thymus serpyllum citratus, Thymus serpyllum citriodorum, and more. It was also believed at one time that the plant was a hybrid of European garden origin, between Thymus pulegioides and Thymus vulgaris. DNA analysis has shown that T. citriodorus is not part of the DNA tree that includes T. pulegioides and T. vulgaris.

Cultivars

Cultivars are selected for foliage color, and aromas of different citrus fruits. The following are sold by various nurseries, often under the synonyms, so scientific naming is not reliable:
 Lemon Supreme — Light mauve flowers on vigorous plants with much richer lemon scent than that of most lemon thymes.
 ‘Silver-Edged’ (Silver-Edged Lemon Thyme) — Silver-edged green leaves; pink flowers.
 Creeping Golden Lemon — Shiny dark green lemon-scented leaves variegated in gold; lavender flower spikes.
 Orange Thyme— orange, unusually low growing.
 Lime Thyme  — mounding ground cover with bright chartreuse green leaves, slightly to powerfully lime scented and flavored leaves, lavender-pink flowers.

References

External links
 Copy of Nature Heritage article explaining naming
  PFAF Plant Database treatment: Thymus x citriodorus (Lemon Thyme)

citriodorus
Flora of Europe
Herbs
Edible plants
Butterfly food plants
Garden plants of Europe
Drought-tolerant plants
Groundcovers